The name Andy has been used for three tropical cyclones in the northwest Pacific Ocean.

 Typhoon Andy (1982) (T8209, 10W, Iliang), struck Taiwan and China
 Typhoon Andy (1985) (T8519, 18W), struck Vietnam
 Super Typhoon Andy (1989) (T8902, 02W), passed to the southeast of Guam in the mid-Pacific

Pacific typhoon set index articles